Peter von Krockow (2 June 1935 – 25 January 2018) was a German fencer. He represented the United Team of Germany at the 1960 Summer Olympics in the team sabre event.

References

1935 births
2018 deaths
German male fencers
Olympic fencers of the United Team of Germany
Fencers at the 1960 Summer Olympics
Von Krockow family